Jessica Cruz, one of the characters known as Green Lantern, is a superheroine appearing in American comic books published by DC Comics. Created by Geoff Johns, Doug Mahnke, Ivan Reis and Ethan Van Sciver, she is a member of the Green Lantern Corps and Justice League. Her first full appearance takes place in Justice League (vol. 2) #31 (August 2014), which is also her first cover appearance. Cruz currently operates out of Portland, Oregon.

The character made her cinematic debut in the animated film DC League of Super-Pets, voiced by Dascha Polanco.

Publication history
Jessica Cruz's name is mentioned and her right hand appears briefly in a single panel of the 2013 issue Green Lantern #20. Her next appearance comes in Justice League (vol. 2) #30, when the Ring of Volthoom locates her, and she then gains her powers in the following issue. She was dubbed "Power Ring" while she was host to the Ring of Volthoom but is not a member of Crime Syndicate of America. Jessica becomes an official member of the Green Lantern Corps, in the Prime Earth reality, at the end of The Darkseid War storyline.

Fictional character biography

The New 52
Jessica Cruz and her friends are on a hunting trip when they accidentally stumble across two men burying a body. The men brutally murder her friends. Jessica manages to escape but is left traumatized. The Ring of Volthoom, which feeds off fear and had abandoned Power Ring after his death during the Crime Syndicate's incursion to Prime Earth, is able to locate her due to her trauma. Unlike the previous ring bearers, she does not willingly accept the ring, but is forced to accept it. The Ring tortures Jessica with physical and psychological pain. The Ring explains that it is using Jessica to attract the being that destroyed Earth-Three to Prime Earth because he is now dying (for reasons not explained) and wants to take the planet with him.

Batman is able to de-power the ring after convincing Jessica to face her fears. During the AMAZO Virus arc, Jessica succumbs to the effects of the virus, but is cured once a antidote is synthesized from Superman. Hal Jordan returns to Earth following these events to teach Jessica how to control her ring.

When Darkseid's daughter Grail arrives on Prime Earth, she attacks Jessica and uses her ring to open a portal to Earth-Three, allowing the Anti-Monitor to cross over to Prime Earth. Jessica and the rest of the Justice League are then transported away by Metron. After this, the Justice League decides to free the Crime Syndicate to help in the fight against the Anti-Monitor and Grail. Jessica, Cyborg and Mister Miracle head to the prison and the close proximity to the Syndicate allows the Ring to possess Jessica's mind and body. During the Justice League's confrontation against Grail and Darkseid, Grail manages to separate the Flash from the Black Racer, which immediately begins to pursue the Flash. Realizing the Racer will not leave the physical plane of existence until it reaps a soul, Jessica convinces Cyborg to tap into the ring's technology and override Volthoom's control over Jessica's body for a few seconds. This allows Jessica to jump between Flash and the Black Racer, allowing the incarnation of death to apparently kill her. Jessica survives, and it is revealed that the Black Racer killed Volthoom instead, causing the ring to crumble into dust. Immediately afterwards, a Green Lantern ring descends at the battlefield and transforms Jessica into a new Green Lantern.

DC Rebirth/DC Universe
In Green Lanterns: Rebirth #1, she meets Simon Baz when he is investigating an alien intrusion, which turns out to be a Manhunter who battles the two of them. It is then revealed to be a training exercise run by Hal Jordan to test the two as team. He proceeds to combine Jessica and Simon's power batteries to make them work together as partners and puts them in charge of protecting Earth, also giving them membership to the Justice League. 

When confronting the threat of the Phantom Ring, a prototype power ring that can channel the entirety of the emotional spectrum at the cost of rapidly shifting depending on the emotional state of the user, Jessica confesses to her own doubts about whether she deserves her ring given the unconventional circumstances of her recruitment. However, her fears are assuaged when she temporarily dons the Phantom Ring and it automatically transforms her into a Green Lantern, allowing Jessica to recognize her success at overcoming her old fears rather than believing that she was defined by that experience.

She is later sent to space to train with the Green Lantern Corps and is under the orders of Guy Gardner who just pushes her around and berates her until she has had enough and attacks him; Guy later strikes a deal with her that if she successfully defeats him in combat he will not talk about the encounter, which she is able to do.

Later, Jessica is assigned to monitor the newly-released Ghost Sector of space (a region consisting entirely of planets stolen by Coluans that was freed by the Justice League); while there, she encounters Cyborg, Starfire and Azrael piloting a skullship commandeered from Brainiac in an attempt to enter the sector. Attempting to stop them, she finds herself trapped in the Ghost Sector alongside the others, and they band together to investigate the mysterious region of space as the Justice League Odyssey. 

She is later killed by Darkseid and her ring smashes and absorbs omega radiation and merges with her arm. The ring fragments resurrect her and grant her more powers. She later teams with Orion, Dexstarr and Blackfire to find her fellow Odyssey members, when they are taken by Darkseid.

Powers and abilities

As a Green Lantern, Jessica is capable of projecting energy-based constructions, flight, and utilizing various other abilities through her power ring which are only limited by her imagination and willpower. Jessica's signature constructs are massive, intricate structures with an organic appearance similar to a giant alien flower. She initially experienced some trouble in creating constructs with the ring, requiring a period of intense concentration to generate larger constructs, but overcame this limitation while training with Simon Baz.

While Jessica was briefly a Power Ring, she initially had no control over the ring. Under the tutelage of Hal Jordan, she learns to overcome the evil powers within the Ring and use it effectively until Volthoom possesses her body. Her feelings of courage help Cyborg decipher the alien language of the ring, and he is able to let her overcome Volthoom's influence for a moment and jump between Black Racer and the Flash which ends up destroying Volthoom and the Ring, freeing Jessica.

Jessica is also an adept survivalist and was able to live by herself for three years. She was seen wielding a shotgun with proficiency when she was able to hit the Ring of Volthoom and keep it at bay for a few moments before it made her its host.

It has recently been revealed that Jessica's ring is partly fused with Volthoom's Travel Lantern, due to it being one of the first seven power rings created by the rogue Guardian Rami during Volthoom's first attack on Oa, ten billion years ago. It was the Travel Lantern that allowed Volthoom to make his initial journey to the past, and Jessica's ring connection to it also resulted in Jessica accidentally using the ring to send herself and Simon into the past to escape Volthoom, only to find themselves at the time of Volthoom's assault on Oa.

In other media

Television
Jessica Cruz appears in DC Super Hero Girls (2019), voiced by Myrna Velasco. This version does not appear to suffer from past trauma, has two moms, and is a pacifist, vegetarian, animal rights activist, and environmentalist who becomes friends with Pam Isley.

Film
 Jessica Cruz appears in Lego DC Super Hero Girls: Super-Villain High, voiced by Cristina Milizia.
 Jessica Cruz appears in Lego DC Comics Super Heroes: Aquaman: Rage of Atlantis, voiced again by Cristina Milizia. This version is a member of the Justice League.
 Jessica Cruz appears in Justice League vs. the Fatal Five, voiced by Diane Guerrero. This version suffers from agoraphobia as a result of survivor's guilt after narrowly escaping being murdered alongside her friends when they stumbled across a murderer burying a body. Despite being chosen by a Green Lantern ring, she refuses to use it nor join the Justice League. After being targeted by the Fatal Five, she meets and befriends Star Boy, who also suffers from mental illness, and eventually overcomes her fears and becomes a Green Lantern.
 Jessica Cruz appears in Lego DC: Shazam!: Magic and Monsters, voiced again by Cristina Milizia.
 Jessica Cruz appears in Teen Titans Go! & DC Super Hero Girls: Mayhem in the Multiverse, voiced again by Myrna Velasco.
 Jessica Cruz appears in DC League of Super-Pets, voiced by Dascha Polanco. This version is a member of the Justice League who later becomes Chip's owner.

Video games
 Jessica Cruz appears as a playable character in the mobile version of Injustice: Gods Among Us.
 Jessica Cruz appears as a playable character in DC Legends. After narrowing escaping a criminal gang who killed her friends, this version suffers from crippling fear and guilt, which made her a target of a power ring from the anti-matter universe until she eventually breaks free of its control and joins the Green Lantern Corps.
 Jessica Cruz appears as an unlockable playable character in Lego DC Super-Villains.

Miscellaneous
 Jessica Cruz appears in DC Super Hero Girls (2015), voiced by Cristina Milizia. This version is Lois Lane's shy camerawoman.
 Jessica Cruz appears as a playable character in Cryptozoic Entertainment's DC Deck-Building Game: Rebirth.

References

Comics characters introduced in 2013
DC Comics female superheroes
Characters created by Geoff Johns
Characters created by Ethan Van Sciver
Fictional characters from Oregon
Fictional characters with post-traumatic stress disorder
Fictional pacifists
Fictional conservationists and environmentalists
Fictional vegan and vegetarian characters
Fictional Mexican-American people
Fictional Honduran-American people
Mexican superheroes
Green Lantern Corps officers